John Stafford (died 25 May 1452) was a medieval English prelate and statesman who served as Lord Chancellor (1432–1450) and as Archbishop of Canterbury (1443–1452).

Early life and education
Stafford was the illegitimate son of Sir Humphrey Stafford of Southwick, a Wiltshire squire, and required papal permission before he became the rector of Farmborough, vicar of Bathampton and prebendary of Wells.

He was educated at the University of Oxford.

Career
Stafford was appointed Dean of Arches in 1419 and served as Archdeacon of Salisbury from 1419 to 1421. From 1423 to 1424 he was Dean of Wells.

He came to note under Henry VI, becoming Lord Privy Seal in 1421 and Lord High Treasurer the following year. He was Lord Chancellor from 1432 to 1450.

On 18 December 1424 Pope Martin V made him Bishop of Bath and Wells, and he was consecrated on 27 May 1425. Pope Eugene IV made him Archbishop of Canterbury in May 1443, a position he held until his death on 25 May 1452. He steered an even course between parties as a moderate man and useful official.

His grand nephew Humphrey Stafford of Hooke rose in prominence in the King's party thereafter.

Further reading
Rogers, William Henry Hamilton, Strife of the Roses and Days of the Tudors in the West, Exeter, 1890, Chapter 5, "With the Silver Hand", Stafford of Suthwyke, Archbishop and Earl (Detailed discussion of the Bishop's origins).

Citations

References

 

Year of birth unknown
Archdeacons of Salisbury
Lords Privy Seal
Lord chancellors of England
Lord High Treasurers of England
Deans of Wells
Bishops of Bath and Wells
Archbishops of Canterbury
15th-century English Roman Catholic archbishops
1452 deaths
Burials at Canterbury Cathedral
Alumni of the University of Oxford